Casertana Football Club is an Italian association football club based in Caserta, Campania. The club currently plays in Serie D.

History
The club was founded in 1908 as Robur Caserta and became known as Unione Sportiva Casertana from 1928 until 2005, when the team was cancelled by the federation. The club also had two stints in Serie B in 1970–71 and 1991–92.

The club was refounded in 2005 as A.S. Caserta Calcio and was later renamed A.S. Casertana Calcio. During the 2009–10 Serie D season, the side took back its traditional denomination.

Casertana made its return to professionalism at the end of the 2012–13 season, after finishing fourth in Serie D, thus reaching the promotion play-off only to be beaten by Virtus Verona in the final. However, the club was successively admitted into Lega Pro Seconda Divisione as a replacement for a number of teams that went bankrupt by the end of the season. The club ended the 2013–14 season in second place, thus qualifying to the 2014–15 Lega Pro division.

Colours and badge
The colours of the team are red and blue.

Players

Current squad
As of 15 December 2022.

Club officials

Board of directors 

 Last updated: 2 November 2020
 Source:

Current technical staff 

 Last updated: 2 November 2020
 Source:

Nearby clubs 
Casertana shared a local rivalry with Piedimonte Matese-based clubs A.S.D. Tre Pini Matese, F.W.P. Matese (now both defunct), as well as Alife-based club A.S.D. Alliphae. They share a local rivalry with Tre Pini's successor club A.S.D. Football Club Matese.

Notable former managers
  Giuseppe Materazzi
  Nedo Sonetti
  Adriano Lombardi

Honours
Source: Casertanafc.it

Serie C1
Champions (1): 1969–70,  1990–91
Serie C2
Champions (1): 1980–81
Serie D
Champions (3): 1949–50, 1962–63, 1995–96
Runners-up (2) : 1960–61, 1977–78
Eccellenza Campania
Champions (1): 2006–07
Promozione Campania
Champions (1): 1953–54

References

External links
 Official homepage

Football clubs in Campania
Caserta
Association football clubs established in 1924
Italian football First Division clubs
Serie B clubs
Serie C clubs
Serie D clubs
1908 establishments in Italy
2005 establishments in Italy